Villajoyosa Club de Fútbol is a Spanish football team based in Vila Joiosa, in the autonomous community of Valencia. Founded in 1942, in the 2022–23 season, the club competes in Regional Preferente – Group 4, holding home matches at the Estadio Nou Pla, with a capacity of 4,000.

Season to season

6 seasons in Segunda División B
17 seasons in Tercera División
1 season in Tercera División RFEF

Notable former players
 Raúl Fabiani
 Vicente Borge
 José Mañuz

Notable former coaches
 Vicente Borge
 Joaquín Carbonell
 Luis García

External links
FFCV team profile 
Futbolme team profile 

Football clubs in the Valencian Community
Association football clubs established in 1944
Divisiones Regionales de Fútbol clubs
1944 establishments in Spain
Villajoyosa